Bronchocela hayeki, the Sumatra bloodsucker, is a species of lizard. It is endemic to Indonesia. It is named after the Austrian-German painter Hans Von Hayek, who spent many years in Indonesia and Ceylon during World War I .

References

Bronchocela
Reptiles described in 1928
Taxa named by Lorenz Müller
Reptiles of Indonesia
Fauna of Sumatra